The 2007 Harrogate Council election took place on 3 May 2007 to elect members of Harrogate Borough Council in North Yorkshire, England. One third of the council was up for election and the council stayed under no overall control.

After the election, the composition of the council was
Conservative 25
Liberal Democrat 23
Independent 6

Campaign
Before the election the Conservatives ran the council, but without a majority, with 27 seats, compared to 22 Liberal Democrats and 5 independents. 20 seats were contested in the election, with 1 of the seats being a by-election in Marston Moor ward after the resignation of the Conservative councillor. Both the Conservatives and Liberal Democrats were defending 9 seats in the election, while independents held 2.

The election saw the British National Party contest 15 of the 20 seats, more than Labour who only contested 9 seats, and up from only 1 in 2006. The leader of the British National Party Nick Griffin visited Ripon during the campaign, with the party campaigning against migrant workers, such as those from Poland, who they said were "undercutting British workers" by working for low wages. For the first time the United Kingdom Independence Party also contested 2 seats in the election.

Election result
The results saw no party win a majority on the council after the Liberal Democrats gained 2 seats from the Conservatives. The Liberal Democrats gained Bilton and Knaresborough King James from the Conservatives, but the Conservatives remained the largest party on the council with 25 seats compared to 23 for the Liberal Democrats.

The balance on the council was held by 6 independents, after independents won all 3 seats contested in Ripon. This included gaining Ripon Spa by 171 votes from Liberal Democrat Paul Freeman, who had held the seat for 16 years. No other party won any seats, with the British National Party coming no better than third in every seat they contested, despite having 15 candidates.

Ward results

References

2007
2007 English local elections
2000s in North Yorkshire